Most United States presidents have kept pets while in office, or pets have been part of their families. Only James K. Polk, Andrew Johnson, and Donald Trump did not have any presidential pets while in office. However, Johnson did take care of some mice he found in his bedroom.

History of White House pets
The first White House dog to receive regular newspaper coverage was Warren G. Harding's dog Laddie Boy.

Pets also featured in presidential elections. Herbert Hoover got a "Belgian Police Dog" (Belgian Malinois), King Tut, during his campaign and pictures of him with his new dog were sent all across the United States.

Theodore Roosevelt was known for having many pets in the White House. He had six children who owned pets including snakes, dogs, cats, a badger, birds, and guinea pigs.

In 1944, Franklin D. Roosevelt was running for his fourth term when rumors surfaced that his Scottish Terrier, Fala, had accidentally been left behind when visiting the Aleutian Islands. After allegedly sending back ships to rescue his dog, Roosevelt was ridiculed and accused of spending thousands of taxpayers' dollars to retrieve his dog. At a speech following this Roosevelt said, "You can criticize me, my wife and my family, but you can't criticize my little dog. He's Scotch and all these allegations about spending all this money have just made his little soul furious." What was later called the "Fala speech" reportedly helped secure reelection for Roosevelt.

Richard Nixon was accused of hiding a secret slush fund during his candidacy for vice president under Dwight D. Eisenhower in 1952. He gave the televised "Checkers speech" named after his cocker spaniel, denying he had a slush fund but admitting, "there is one thing that I did get as a gift that I'm not going to give back." The gift was a black-and-white cocker spaniel, Checkers, given to his daughters. Although there had been talk of Nixon being dropped from the ticket, following his speech he received an increase in support and Mamie Eisenhower reportedly recommended he stay because he was "such a warm person."

Animal lovers were upset when President Lyndon B. Johnson was photographed lifting his beagles, named Him and Her, by their ears. Others did not understand the uproar; former president Harry S. Truman said, "What the hell are the critics complaining about; that's how you handle hounds."  Him died after he was run over by the presidential limousine.

Bill Clinton moved into the White House with Socks, a tuxedo cat, who in 1991 was reported to have jumped into the arms of Chelsea Clinton after piano lessons while the Clintons were living in Little Rock, Arkansas.  He was later joined in 1997 by Buddy, a Labrador Retriever, during Clinton's second term. The two reportedly did not get along, with Clinton later saying "I did better with the Palestinians and the Israelis than I've done with Socks and Buddy" while Hillary Clinton said Socks "despised" Buddy at first sight.  The two were, however, the subject of a book, Dear Socks, Dear Buddy: Kids' Letters to the First Pets written by then First Lady Hillary Clinton and appeared as cartoons in the kids' section of the first White House website.

While George W. Bush was president, he had three dogs and a cat at the White House.  Among the canines was Spot Fetcher, an English Springer Spaniel and the offspring of George H. W. Bush's dog, Millie.  This made Spotty the first animal to live in the White House under two different administrations, having been born there in 1989 and passed away there in 2004.

Barack and Michelle Obama were without pets prior to the 2008 election, but promised their daughters they could get a dog when the family moved into the White House. They selected Bo, a Portuguese Water Dog, partly due to Malia Obama's allergies and the need for a hypoallergenic pet. The puppy was a gift from Senator Ted Kennedy and was later joined by Sunny, a female of the same breed.  Bo was featured in the 2010 children's book Of Thee I Sing: A Letter to My Daughters, written by President Obama with illustrations by Loren Long.

Joe and Jill Biden moved into the White House with two German Shepherds, Champ and Major. Major was the first shelter dog in the White House, while Champ returned to Washington, having joined the Biden family during Joe Biden's tenure as vice-president. The Bidens announced the death of 13-year-old Champ on June 19, 2021. In December 2021, the Bidens announced the arrival of a pedigreed German Shepherd puppy named Commander, gifted to them by Joe Biden's brother. Officials later told the press that Major had been rehomed to a quieter environment following a series of biting incidents. The Bidens had also promised they would get a cat, and they fulfilled that promise in January 2022 by adding a two-year-old gray tabby, Willow, to the family.

List of presidential pets
In addition to traditional pets, this list includes some animals normally considered livestock or working animals that have a close association with presidents or their families.  Presidents have often been given exotic animals from foreign dignitaries; occasionally these are kept, but often they are promptly donated to a zoo.

Key

See also

 Canadian Parliamentary Cats
 Chief Mouser to the Cabinet Office, United Kingdom
 Hermitage cats in Saint Petersburg, Russia
 Pets of Vladimir Putin
 Sully, retired President George H. W. Bush's service dog during his final months of life
 Tibs the Great
 Taiwanese presidential pets
 List of individual cats
 List of individual dogs
 :Category:Pets of the British Royal Family

Further reading
 Truman, Margaret (1969). White House Pets  ; eBook (2016)

Notes

References

External links

 White House Pets: Animal Ambassadors – The White House Historical Association
 Presidential Pets Museum – Private museum in Glen Allen, Virginia
 Pets in the White House – White House for Kids (official Clinton archive)
 

 
Animals in politics
Pets
Pets in the United States